A steam crane is a crane powered by a steam engine.  It may be fixed or mobile and, if mobile, it may run on rail tracks, caterpillar tracks, road wheels, or be mounted on a barge.  It usually has a vertical boiler placed at the back so that the weight of the boiler counterbalances the weight of the jib and load.

They were very common as railway breakdown cranes and several have been preserved on heritage railways in the  United Kingdom.

Manufacturers
 Black Hawthorn of Gateshead (unrestored example at Beamish Museum
 Joseph Booth & Bros of Leeds
 Coles Cranes of Derby (restored example at Beamish Museum)
 Cowans, Sheldon & Company of Carlisle (rail cranes)
 Craven Brothers
 William Fairbairn & Sons of Manchester
 Ransomes & Rapier of Ipswich
 Ruston Proctor of Lincoln
 Stothert & Pitt of Bath
 Thomas Smith & Sons (Rodley) Ltd. of Leeds

See also

 Crane
 Crane (railroad)
 Crane tank
 Fairbairn steam crane
 Steam engine
 Steam shovel

References

 See external links

External links

 Steam cranes inc. Ransomes & Rapier
 Cowans & Sheldon steam crane
 Nine Elms steam crane
 Ransomes & Rapier wartime-ordered 45-ton Steam Breakdown Cranes
 Cowans Sheldon 15-ton Steam Cranes
 Model steam crane

 
Cranes (machines)
Crane